The White Mutiny was the unrest that occurred at the dissolution of the "European Forces" of the British East India Company in India during the mid-19th century in the wake of the Indian Rebellion of 1857. There was another incident which occurred in India in 1766, the Monghyr Mutiny: a "White mutiny" among British brigadiers, on occasion of their reduced military allowances, which was suppressed by Robert Clive.

Background
Until 1861 there were two separate military forces under British control operating in India. One comprised those units of the British Army serving tours of duty in India and known as the "Queen's" army; the other were the units of the East India Company (EIC). The Company's troops were a mixture of "European" regiments of Britons recruited specifically for service in India and "Native" regiments recruiting from the locality with British officers.

The Queens Army was the sovereign crown's military force. The British Army officer class was characterized by Officers who had "Purchased commission" and then risen by further purchase, seniority or battlefield commission. The positions of officers of the European regiments were not bought by purchase but advancement was normally by seniority. In both armies promotion could be accelerated by losses or transfers on active service.

Units of the EIC received batta – extra allowances of pay to cover various expenditures relating to operations out of the home territories while British Army units did not. Officers of the British Army were senior to those of the same rank in the EIC.

The dissimilarities in the physical makeup of these two forces led to many cultural differences in how they operated and how they viewed each other.  These cultural differences led to deep misunderstandings between the two forces.

After the mutiny of native units of the Company's forces in 1857, the Crown took over the affairs of the Company. With the takeover of the Company's activities its units were transferred to the Crown.'

Mutiny
In the negotiations of the terms for the transfer there were several issues. One was that the Governor General, Canning, did not give the "European Forces" notice of their transfer to the "Queens Army". Another was a result of Canning's legalistic interpretation of the laws surrounding the transfer. A third was in the misunderstanding that stemmed from cultural differences between the two forces. This was aggravated by influential articles printed by British periodicals of the time that wrongly painted the European Force as undisciplined, unhealthy, and mutinous in nature.

The laws were quite clear and the legality of the transfer was well established, but because both the British government and the Government of India ignored the views of those it was to affect, the officers and men of the European Forces were alienated to the point of open mutiny. Aggravating the condition was the still unsettled Indian rebellion of 1857. The White mutiny of the European Forces was seen as a potential undermining of the already rocky British rule in India with a potential of inciting renewed rebellion among the "still excited population throughout India".

The White mutiny was highly successful in meeting its aims. The demands of the European Forces officers and men were centralized around a demand for either an enlistment bonus/bounty or release from their obligations. In this aim they were highly successful, achieving a promise of free and clear release with free passage home. Events that had occurred at some of the installations, including open rebellion and physical violence both on the part of the men and the officers of the European Forces, were such that there was little possibility of the European Forces being generally accepted into the Queens Army. Ultimately 10,116 men opted to return home, of whom only 2,809 re-enlisted.

In popular culture
 In Robert A. Heinlein's novel The Number of the Beast, a form of nonviolent protest consisting of exact and literal obedience to instructions is referred to as a "White Mutiny".
 It is used in that sense in Patrick Rothfuss's novel The Name of the Wind  (p. 593, New York: DAW Books, 2008 paperback).
 A synonym for "malicious compliance"

References

 Cardew, Alexander Gordon. The white mutiny, a forgotten episode in the history of the Indian army. London,: Constable, 1929 – except that this book deals with an earlier protest, among the European officers of the Madras Army).
 Peter Stanley White Mutiny: British Military Culture in India 1825–75 (Christopher Hurst, London, 1998).

1860s in British India
Mutinies